Tando Mitha Khan (Sindhi: ٽنڊو مٺا خان) is a town of Taluka and District Sangher, Sindh, Pakistan. Located on the bank of Nara Canal, this town is connected to Sangher, Khipro and Khairpur Mirs through roads. It is located at the longitude of 71.6119 and latitude of 29.0475. This town was founded by Mir Mitha Khan in the eighteen century. Population of the town is 5,237 (2017). This town is headquarter of Town Committee and Deh Tando Mitha Khan. The town is located 27.8 kilometers (17.3 miles) in the southeast of Sangher City and 28 kilometers in the northwest of Khipro town.

Post Code of Tando Mitha Khan is 68140.

References 

Populated places in Sanghar District